Yevhen Prokopenko Yevgeny Prokopenko born 13 September 1988 in Bakhchisaray Raion, Ukrainian SSR, Soviet Union (now Russia), is a  Ukrainian-born Russian football midfielder currently playing for PFC Sevastopol.

External links 
 Profile on Official Site

1988 births
Living people
People from Bakhchysarai Raion
Ukrainian footballers
FC Sevastopol players
Russian footballers

Association football midfielders
FC Sevastopol (Russia) players